Delage was a French automobile manufacturer

Delage or Delâge may also refer to:

People
 Cyrille-Fraser Delâge (1869–1957), Quebec politician
 Guy Delage, French swimmer who claimed to have crossed the Atlantic solo
 Louis Delâge (1874–1947), French automobile engineer and manufacturer
 Maurice Delage (1879–1961) French composer and pianist
 Mickaël Delage (b. 1985), French professional cyclist
 Pierre Delage (1887–1918), French aviator
 Yves Delage (1854–1920), French zoologist

Other uses
 Delage (band), a British girl pop group in the 1990s
 Lac-Delage, Quebec, a town and lake in Canada
 Nieuport-Delage, a French aeroplane manufacturing company

See also
 Delarge (disambiguation)